Kim Anand Thayil (born September 4, 1960) is an American musician best known as the lead guitarist of the Seattle-based rock band Soundgarden, which he co-founded with singer Chris Cornell and bassist Hiro Yamamoto in 1984. Cornell and Thayil remained as the original members of the band until Cornell's death in 2017, and the band's subsequent split in 2018. Thayil was named the 100th greatest guitarist of all time by Rolling Stone in 2010, and the 67th greatest guitarist of all time by SPIN in 2012. Thayil has won two Grammy Awards as a member of Soundgarden.

Biography

Childhood and early life
Born in Seattle in 1960, Thayil grew up in the Chicago suburb of Park Forest. His parents came from the state of Kerala in India to Seattle. His mother  Shanti Thayil was a music teacher who studied to be a concert pianist at the Royal Academy of Music. His father Boniface Thayil earned a degree in chemical engineering, received employment in Chicago and moved there with his family.

Thayil started writing lyrics at 12 years old. In 1977, he formed his first band in Chicago, Bozo and the Pinheads, a punk rock band. They did both original songs (written by Thayil and inspired by his punk music tastes) and cover tunes (mostly the Sex Pistols, Devo and the Ramones). Their first gig was at a school talent show for an audience of about 500 people.

He played guitar in a post-punk band called Identity Crisis in 1980, and released a 7" inch EP called "Pretty Feet".

Thayil met Hiro Yamamoto at Rich East High School in Park Forest. He graduated, along with Hiro Yamamoto, from the Active Learning Process School (ALPS) at Rich East High School in 1979, the same school Bruce Pavitt graduated from 2 years earlier, in 1977. He and Yamamoto decided to move to Olympia, Washington, to study at The Evergreen State College, but they were unable to find jobs and decided to move to Seattle. There, Thayil earned money as a DJ for KCMU and earned a degree in philosophy at the University of Washington. In Seattle they also met Chris Cornell, a roommate, and the three formed Soundgarden in 1984.

Soundgarden (1984–1997)
Soundgarden became the first of Seattle's grunge bands to sign with a major label (A&M Records). They went on to release five albums, including three which went platinum at least once, and won two Grammys.

Thayil became acclaimed for his guitar work, which was typically characterized by heavy riffing, and was cited among other grunge guitarists as an influence and a pioneer of the "Seattle Sound." In 1994, Thayil commented, "I think Soundgarden is a pretty good band and I'm a fine guitarist. I'm not God, but I'm certainly not average. I feel very comfortable with the fact that not many other people can do what I do on guitar. I think my guitar is happy with the way I play it."

Originally one of Soundgarden's main songwriters, Thayil's contributions as a writer eventually dwindled to just one song on Down on the Upside, "Never the Machine Forever", although he contributed to details in every song, as did every band member. Thayil explained that "Collaboration was paramount in our early music, especially right at the beginning when it was me on guitar, Hiro on bass and Chris on drums," but eventually all four members became songwriters of their own, "all writing guitar parts that I had to learn." This led him to do "Never the Machine Forever" all on his own, as Thayil thought "Well, if I'm going to have a song on this fucking record, I'm going to have to write lyrics."

While a member of Soundgarden, he has written the following songs for the band:

 "Hunted Down" (Screaming Life) ... music
 "Nothing to Say" (Screaming Life) ... music
 "Tears To Forget" (Screaming Life) ... music (co-written)
 "Little Joe" (Screaming Life) ... music
 "Hand of God" (Screaming Life) ... music
 "Kingdom of Come" (Fopp) ... credited to Soundgarden
 "Flower" (Ultramega OK) ... music
 "All Your Lies" (Ultramega OK) ... music (co-written)
 "Circle of Power" (Ultramega OK) ... music
 "Incessant Mace" (Ultramega OK) ... music
 "Hands All Over" (Louder Than Love) ... music

 "Get on the Snake" (Louder Than Love) ... music
 "Heretic" (Loudest Love) ... music
 "Jesus Christ Pose" (Badmotorfinger) ... music (co-written)
 "Room a Thousand Years Wide" (Badmotorfinger) ... lyrics
 "New Damage" (Badmotorfinger) ... music (co-written)
 "My Wave" (Superunknown) ... music (co-written)
 "Superunknown" (Superunknown) ... music (co-written)
 "Limo Wreck" (Superunknown) ... music (co-written)
 "Kickstand" (Superunknown) ... music
 "Never the Machine Forever" (Down on the Upside) ... music and lyrics
 "Black Rain" (Telephantasm) ...music (co-written)

 "Non-State Actor" (King Animal) ...lyrics (co-written)
 "By Crooked Steps" (King Animal) ...music (co-written)
 "A Thousand Days Before" (King Animal) ...music
 "Blood on the Valley Floor" (King Animal) ...music

Post-Soundgarden (1997–2010)
Thayil joined singer Johnny Cash, bassist Krist Novoselic of Nirvana and drummer Sean Kinney of Alice in Chains for a cover of Willie Nelson's "Time of the Preacher", featured on the tribute album Twisted Willie, released in January 1996.

After the 1997 breakup of Soundgarden, Thayil went on to contribute guitar to work by Pigeonhed and Presidents of the United States of America. More recently, he contributed guitar to the track "Blood Swamp" from the 2006 Sunn O)))/Boris album Altar, for which he also wrote liner notes. Thayil also plays lead guitar on a track called "V.O.G." by Ascend, which features Gentry Densley (Iceburn, Eagle Twin) and Greg Anderson (Sunn O))), Engine Kid, Goatsnake). Ascend's record, titled Ample Fire Within, was released in 2008 by Southern Lord Records.

In 1999, Thayil formed a punk band, the No WTO Combo, with Jello Biafra (formerly of Dead Kennedys), Krist Novoselic (formerly of Nirvana, at the time a member of Sweet 75), and Gina Mainwal (also of Sweet 75). The band was formed to celebrate and further the rampant protest activity against the WTO Ministerial Conference of 1999, which was held on November 30, 1999. Originally scheduled to play at The Showbox on that same evening, police prevented the band from doing so, forcing the show to be rescheduled for the following night. This was Thayil's first live concert since the breakup of Soundgarden. The show was recorded by Mark Cavener and mixed by Soundgarden producer Jack Endino; it was released as the album Live from the Battle in Seattle in May 2000.

In 2003, Rolling Stone magazine named Thayil #100 on the list of the "100 greatest guitarists of all time".

In 2004, Thayil played guitar for Probot, Dave Grohl's heavy metal side-project; he was featured on the songs "Ice Cold Man" and "Sweet Dreams."

Thayil was a recurring participant on the Almost Live! sketch comedy show, calling things "lame" during "The Lame List" segments.

In 2009, Thayil played with Soundgarden's Matt Cameron and Ben Shepherd at a show in Seattle on March 24, 2009, at the Crocodile Cafe that was headlined by Tom Morello's The Nightwatchman. It was the first time the three had played together in public since the band's 1997 breakup. The three were joined by Tad Doyle of fellow 1990s Seattle band TAD, and performed three Soundgarden songs. For the last song (Spoonman) they were joined by Tom Morello (Morello had played the song before with Audioslave). Thayil has also played with Greg Gilmore of Mother Love Bone and Danny Kelly of Heliotroupe in the group Set & Setting. Their debut performance was October 31, 2009 above the famed K Records warehouse now known as the Cherry Street Loft ("The Loft on Cherry") in Olympia, Washington.

Soundgarden reunion (2010–2018)
On January 1, 2010, it was announced through Facebook and Twitter posts by Chris Cornell that the official Soundgarden fanclub had been restarted. On April 15, 2010, it was announced that Soundgarden would play its first show since 1997 the following day at the Showbox at the Market in its Seattle hometown. The band played under the name 'Nudedragons', an anagram for Soundgarden.

On August 5, 2010, the band played their first reunion show under the Soundgarden name at The Vic Theatre in Chicago. Three days later, on August 8, 2010, they headlined the final night of Lollapalooza in Grant Park.

In September 2010, the band released the compilation album Telephantasm. November 2012 saw the release of King Animal, their first studio album since 1996.

In 2012, Thayil voiced a character in Season IV: Church of the Black Klok's "Dethcamp" in the Adult Swim original series Metalocalypse.

On May 18, 2017, Chris Cornell was found dead in his hotel room, cancelling the rest of their tour and the band was disbanded again in 2018, with the exception of their one-off show of Tribute to Chris Cornell in January 2019.

In March 2018, it was announced that original member of the proto punk band MC5,  Wayne Kramer would embark on a 35 date tour of North America for their 50th anniversary of the band's debut Kick Out the Jams, recruiting Thayil to play guitar along with Brendan Canty of Fugazi, Doug Pinnick of King's X, and Marcus Durant of Zen Guerrilla.

Projects outside Soundgarden 
In 2020 Thayil played guitar solos on the song "The Firebird" for the jazz fusion band, the Barret Martin Group. In 2021 Kim Thayil played lead guitar and Matt Cameron played drums for a track, "Only Love Can Save Me Now", on the new Pretty Reckless album. Pretty Reckless frontwoman Taylor Momsen said that without Thayil, recording the track would have been impossible, as "Kim is a master – there's no-one else like him."

In December 2020, Thayil, Krist Novoselic, Jennifer Johnson, Jillian Raye, Jeff Fielder and Ben Smith performed the song "Drone" at the Seattle Museum of Pop Culture's tribute to Alice in Chains.

In 2021 Thayil appeared on Mastodon's double album Hushed and Grim, playing lead guitar on the track "Had It All."

In 2021 Thayil, along with drummer Matt Cameron, bassist Krist Novoselic, guitarist Bubba Dupree, and vocalists Jennifer Johnson and Jillian Raye formed the group 3rd Secret. Their self-titled debut album, which they recorded at  The Bait Shop in Bellevue, Washington with producer Jack Endino was released in April 2022. The group also performed at the Museum of Pop Culture in Seattle.

Discography
Soundgarden

No WTO Combo
 Live from the Battle in Seattle (2000)

Probot
 Probot (2004)

Sunn O))) and Boris
 Altar (2006)

3rd Secret
 3rd Secret (2022)

References

External links

1960 births
Living people
Grunge musicians
Musicians from Seattle
Soundgarden members
Alternative rock guitarists
Sub Pop artists
American male musicians of Indian descent
American musicians of Indian descent
University of Washington College of Arts and Sciences alumni
American people of Malayali descent
Lead guitarists
Alternative metal guitarists
American heavy metal guitarists
People from Park Forest, Illinois
20th-century American guitarists
21st-century American guitarists
American male guitarists
3rd Secret members